is a Japanese multinational banking and financial services institution headquartered in Yurakucho, Chiyoda, Tokyo, Japan. The group operates in retail, corporate, and investment banking segment worldwide. It provides financial products and services to a wide range of clients, including individuals, small and medium-sized enterprises, large corporations, financial institutions and public sector entities. Since 2011, it has been included into the Financial Stability Board's list of global systemically important banks.

SMBC group operates in over 40 countries and maintains a presence in all International Financial Centres as the 12th biggest bank in the world by total assets. It is one of the largest global financial institutions in project finance space by total loan value. As of May 2020, SMBC group is listed as 80th largest public company in the world according to Forbes ranking.

It is the second largest banking institution by total assets and market capitalization in Japan. Along with MUFJ Financial Group and Mizuho Financial Group, SMBC group is referred to as a Japanese megabank, one of the three largest banking institutions who dominate market share in Japan's financial system. It is closely affiliated with Sumitomo and Mitsui keiretsu.

The core subsidiary of SMBC group is the banking unit, Sumitomo Mitsui Banking Corporation (SMBC). Sumitomo Mitsui Financial Group acts as the holding company for the group. The other major subsidiaries include SMBC Nikko Securities, SMBC Trust Bank, Sumitomo Mitsui DS Asset Management, Sumitomo Mitsui Finance and Leasing and Japan Research Institute (JRI).

Company history

Sakura Bank

 was a Japanese bank based in Tokyo and Kobe. It was formed in April 1990 as the Mitsui Taiyo Kobe Bank (MTKB) by the merger of Mitsui Bank (founded 1876) and Taiyo Kobe Bank (founded 1973).

Sakura bank root can be traced back to July 1876 when its predecessor, Mitsui Bank, was established with capital of two million yen. It was one of the Japanese government's main banks for deposits and tax collections until the formation of the Bank of Japan in 1882. In ensuing decades, the Mitsui family took over numerous government industrial plants to form a major zaibatsu conglomerate, with the bank as one of its core businesses. Mitsui Bank reorganized as an unlimited partnership in 1893, and as a limited company (capital stock: ¥20 million) in 1909.

World War II led Mitsui Bank to distance itself from the Mitsui zaibatsu beginning around 1937, as the bank's large balance of loans to munitions manufacturers made it vulnerable to failure should a recession occur after the war. The solution found by Mitsui's chairman was to merge the bank with the Dai-Ichi Bank, creating a much larger institution outside the Mitsui family's control. In April 1943, Mitsui Bank merged with Dai-Ichi to form Teikoku Bank ("Imperial Bank").

Teikoku almost immediately found itself short of funds, and for the remainder of the war, mainly provided short-term financing, with long-term financing for its munitions manufacturing customers mostly provided by the Industrial Bank of Japan. Dai-Ichi and Mitsui had very different corporate cultures which led to friction between the two; the two banks never completely integrated, and in October 1948, Dai-Ichi Bank separated from Teikoku Bank.

Teikoku Bank listed its shares on the Tokyo and Osaka stock exchanges in May 1949 and changed its name back to Mitsui Bank in January 1954. Mitsui Bank merged with Toto Bank in April 1968.

Around 1960, Mitsui Bank and its general trading company partner Mitsui & Co. formed a horizontal keiretsu alliance between other companies descended from the Mitsui conglomerate, including Toyota, Toshiba, Toyo Menka Kaisha, Ishikawajima-Harima Heavy Industries, Showa Aircraft and Oji Paper.

Mitsui established The Mitsui Bank of California in Los Angeles in 1974, and acquired Manufacturers Bank in 1981, merging the two later that year to form Mitsui Manufacturers Bank (renamed Manufacturers Bank in 1992).

Mitsui Bank agreed to merge with Taiyo Kobe Bank in 1989. The TKB-Mitsui merger, agreed in end of 1989 during the height of the Japanese asset price bubble, was to create the second largest bank in the world behind Dai-Ichi Kangyo Bank. While TKB had a large base of individual and small business customers, Mitsui had a complementary base of larger institutional Clients. The Sakura Bank name was adopted 3 years later in April 1992. The merger was aimed at leveraging these synergies, as well as providing stronger competition against European banks, which were expected to consolidate following a deregulation in 1992.

Sakura became a major corporate and retail bank in the Greater Tokyo Area during the 1990s and was the largest retail bank in Japan by several measures, including housing loan and investment trust sales. However, Sakura incurred massive bad loan write-offs in 1998 and approached one of its major corporate customers, Toyota, for financial support, which was rejected.

Sakura led the consortium that established Japan Net Bank, an online bank, in 2000, and began talks with Sony to establish a second online banking operation in Japan.

The Sumitomo Bank

Sumitomo Bank was established as a private enterprise in November 1895 and reorganized as a limited company with 15 million yen of capital in March 1912. It opened numerous overseas branches during the World War I era as the Sumitomo zaibatsu business globalized.

After World War II, the Sumitomo group was dismantled and its constituent companies were forbidden from using the Sumitomo name. The bank renamed itself Osaka Bank in October 1948. In December 1952, its name was changed back to Sumitomo Bank. Sumitomo was the main bank for several major Japanese manufacturers during the early postwar era, including NEC and Panasonic (Matsushita).

In the 1970s, it lost nearly US$1 billion in the restructuring of Osaka-based general trading company Ataka & Co., which, combined with the contemporaneous bailout of Mazda, had a major impact on Sumitomo's finances, driving it down from the most profitable bank in Japan to being only ninth-ranked. However, the Ataka and Mazda bailouts enhanced Sumitomo's industry reputation by showing its dedication to customers. It became the largest Japanese bank by deposits until the merger of Dai-Ichi Bank and Nippon Kangyo Bank to form Dai-Ichi Kangyo Bank.

In 1986, Sumitomo merged with Heiwa Sogo Bank in order to expand its presence in the Tokyo area. In the same year, it acquired 12.5% of Goldman Sachs.

Sumitomo incurred major losses during the collapse of the Japanese asset price bubble in the 1990s. In 1993 it wrote off 100 billion yen in bad loans, and in 1994 its Nagoya branch manager was murdered in possible connection with a bad debt collection. In 1995, it posted the first net loss of a major Japanese bank in the postwar era. It sold Sumitomo Bank of California, the sixth-largest bank in California, at a steep discount to Zions Bancorporation in 1998 (SBC is now part of California Bank and Trust).

In 1999, amid intensifying competition as other Japanese and foreign banks consolidated, Sumitomo announced its merger with Sakura Bank to form Sumitomo Mitsui Banking Corporation. The merger was approved in June 2000 and combined Sakura's strong retail operation and eastern Japan presence with Sumitomo's strong wholesale operation and western Japan presence.

Sumitomo Mitsui Banking Corporation

Sumitomo Mitsui Banking Corporation (SMBC) was formed by the merger of The Sumitomo Bank and Sakura Bank in April 2001. Sumitomo Bank was a major Japanese bank founded in 1895; while Sakura Bank was a descendant of Mitsui Bank, another major Japanese bank founded in 1876, but with operations dating back to 1683, when the Tokugawa Shogunate granted Mitsui Takatoshi permission to act as a money changer. The merger created one of the world's largest banking group, with similar size to Deutsche Bank and the pending merger that would form Mizuho Bank. However, the newly created bank was still plagued with bad assets at that time post the asset price bubble burst (the Japanese banking industry as a whole suffered from significant non-performing loans during the 1990s and early 2000s). This led to several corporate actions taken by SMBC to clean its balance sheet and raise capital such as writing off its non-performing loans and selling its entire stake in Goldman Sachs.

In 2003, SMBC conducted reverse merger with its subsidiary, Wakashio Bank, to secure financial resources to cover large deferred losses from its equity holdings. Although SMBC was technically dissolved and Wakashio Bank became a company that survived, under the Japanese Commercial Code, the surviving entity took the name Sumitomo Mitsui Banking Corp., just like the disbanded bank name. SMBC President Yoshifumi Nishikawa and Chairman Akishige Okada became president and Chairman of the new entity respectively. Hiroyasu Ichikawa, President of Wakashio Bank, assumed the position of senior managing director. The idea of the reverse merger is to create smaller entity with excess profit. The profit, then, was used to accelerate write-offs of the bank's unrealized securities losses and boost sales of its shareholdings to reduce risk from the fluctuation of stock prices. Post the merger, the new entity grew rapidly through organic and inorganic growth strategy. The assets expanded 
from 102.4 trillion yen in 2003 to more than 200 trillion yen by the end of 2019, making it the 12th largest bank in the world.

At present, the bank serves as the core retail, corporate, and investment banking arm of both the namesake Sumitomo and Mitsui groups. Its traditional client base is made up of Japanese corporates, but overseas corporate lending increased following overseas expansion. SMBC's overseas network consists of 130 branches and offices in 40 countries and regions as of 2018. SMBC provides financial products and services to a wide range of clients, including individuals, small and medium-sized enterprises, large corporations, financial institutions and public sector entities. Since 2008, the Singapore branch has become SMBC's regional hub in Asia Pacific while global headquarters is still maintained in Tokyo, Japan.

SMBC's shares has become listed on the first section of the Tokyo Stock Exchange, the Osaka Securities Exchange and the Nagoya Stock Exchange since December 2002. It has secondary listing in New York Stock Exchange.

The bank steadily increased its tier 1 capital ratios from 12.19% in 2014 to 16.69% as reported in March 2018. Standard & Poor's, Moody’s and Fitch Ratings assigned SMBC's an A1, A and A rating respectively (as at March 2018).

Sumitomo Mitsui Financial Group

Sumitomo Mitsui Financial Group, Inc. (SMFG) was established in December 2002 through a share transfer from Sumitomo Mitsui Banking Corporation. It acts as bank holding and financial services company of Sumitomo Mitsui Banking Corporation.

In February 2003, Sumitomo Mitsui Card Company, Limited, SMBC Leasing Company, Limited, and The Japan Research Institute became wholly owned subsidiaries of SMFG.

SMFG reached an agreement in June 2004 to form a strategic alliance with Promise Co., Ltd. on consumer finance business. The two firms started collaborative business in April 2005.

The same month, SMFG reached an agreement to form a strategic alliance with NTT DoCoMo on credit card business. A portion of the shares of Sumitomo Mitsui Card held by SMFG were transferred to NTT DoCoMo, and Sumitomo Mitsui Card issued new shares and allocated them to NTT DoCoMo by means of third party allocation in July 2005. Collaborative business began in December 2005.

In September 2006, SMBC Friend Securities became a wholly owned subsidiary of SMFG and the following month, SMFG reached an agreement to pursue strategic joint business with the Sumitomo Corporation group in the leasing and auto leasing businesses.

SMFG acquired Nikko Cordial, a brokerage, from Citigroup in May 2009.

In April 2016, Sumitomo Mitsui Finance and Leasing completed the acquisition of General Electric Group's Japan-based leasing business.

Relevant timeline

 April 2001: Sakura Bank and Sumitomo Bank merged to form Sumitomo Mitsui Banking Corporation. (Capital stock: ¥1,276,7 billion)
 December 2002: Sumitomo Mitsui Banking Corporation (SMBC) established a holding company named Sumitomo Mitsui Financial Group, Inc. (SMFG) through a share transfer, SMBC becomes a wholly owned subsidiary of SMFG.
 March 2003: Wakashio Bank (established June 1996) conducted reverse merger with SMBC.
 August 2004: SMBC Group launched competing bid to acquire ailing Japanese bank UFJ, challenging a takeover of UFJ by the Mitsubishi Tokyo Financial Group (see Mitsubishi UFJ Financial Group). While it eventually lost that bid, SMBC is credited with increasing competition within Japan's once staid banking industry.
 July 2008: SMBC Group bought a 2.1 percent stake in Barclays Bank for £500m.
 March 2015: SMBC Group bought HK$6.58 billion (JP¥105 billion, US$849 million) of new Bank of East Asia shares, raising SMBC's stake in the Hong Kong lender to 17.5% from 9.7%.
 January 2019: Sumitomo Mitsui Banking Corporation Indonesia merged with PT Bank Tabungan Pensiunan Nasional Tbk, also known as Bank BTPN. The group owned 96,89% ownership of the bank since the merger was completed on 1 February 2019, with Bank BTPN as the surviving brand. Indonesian authorities approved the merger in December 2018, while Japanese authorities approved the merger a month later.
 March 2020: SMBC Group agreed to buy a 4.9 percent stake in Ares Management. As part of this agreement, the group will make a US$384 million equity investment into the firm.

Corporate structure

Business division

Sumitomo Mitsui Financial Group acts as the holding company for the SMBC group. The core subsidiary of the group is the banking unit, Sumitomo Mitsui Banking Corporation (SMBC).

The group's banking unit is organised in the following structure:

Consumer Banking Unit
Middle Market Unit
Corporate Banking Unit
Investment Banking Unit
International Banking Unit
Treasury Unit
Compliance Unit
Corporate Staff Unit

Throughout the years, the group has expanded into other related businesses such as leasing, brokerage and asset management. As of 2020, the major subsidiaries beside the banking unit include SMBC Nikko Securities, SMBC Trust Bank, Sumitomo Mitsui DS Asset Management, Sumitomo Mitsui Finance and Leasing and Japan Research Institute (JRI).

Brand

Group name
The group was identified by its holding entity name, Sumitomo Mitsui Financial Group (SMFG), until early of 2018. By March 2018, the group established "SMBC Group" as its master brand name. Since then, the corporate group has been referred to as SMBC Group instead of SMFG. The press release by the company stated the move is to associate the brand with the group's core banking business, Sumitomo Mitsui Banking Corporation.

Corporate logo
SMBC Group's corporate logo uses "Rising Mark" sign. The background color is trad green, fresh green. The “SMBC” name is shown on the right side of the rising mark with white block letters.

Mascot character
In 2014, SMBC Group created an original mascot character called Midosuke, which imitates an otter. The body of the character is green in color, the neck of it is covered by a scarf with the color similar to SMBC group's rising mark logo. The character was designed by Tsuneo Goda (Dwarf Co., Ltd.). Originally, it was used mainly for official LINE accounts but later it has been used as commercials character, face design of cash cards or debit cards, and merchandise for bank customers.

Global operations

SMBC Group has offices in:

Overseas subsidiaries and affiliates

The overseas subsidiaries and affiliates of SMBC Group are as follows:
 European Sumitomo Mitsui Banking Corporation
 SMBC Bank EU AG
 Sumitomo Mitsui Banking (China) Co., Ltd.
 Manufacturer's Bank
 Brazil Sumitomo Mitsui Banking Corporation
 PT Bank BTPN Tbk
 Russia Sumitomo Mitsui Banking Corporation
 Sumitomo Mitsui Banking Malaysia
 SMBC Capital Markets Company
 UK SMBC Nikko Capital Markets Company
 SMBC Aviation Capital
 SMBC Lease Finance Company
 SMBC Rail Services LLC
 SMBC Nikko Security America Corporation
 SMBC Financial Services Company
 SMC Cayman Elsie Limited
 S.F.V.I Company
 SMBC International Finance N.V.
 SMC Leasing Investment LLC
 SMC Capital Partners LLC
 SMBC MV ISPC
 SMBC DIP Limited
 SMBC Derivative Products Limited
 SMBC Capital India
 Sumitomo Mitsui Finance Dublin
 Sakura Finance Asia

Acquisitions

SMBC Nikko Securities

The history of SMBC Nikko Securities can be traced back to Nikko Cordial Corporation, which was the holding company for Nikko Cordial Securities. The company was Japan's third largest brokerage until 2008, when Nikko Cordial Corporation became a wholly owned subsidiary of Citigroup; upon completion of share exchange, it merged with Citigroup Japan Holdings Ltd. to form Nikko Citi Holdings Inc., before changing its name to Citigroup Japan Holdings Corp. in 2009.

In October 2009, all of the operations of Nikko Cordial Securities and certain businesses of Nikko Citigroup, such as the domestic stock and bond underwriting business among others, were sold to Sumitomo Mitsui Banking Corporation, before being reorganized into a new subsidiary company, SMBC Nikko Securities Inc., in April 2011. SMBC Nikko Securities becomes investment banking arm of SMBC group and offers equity and debt financing, trading, and merger and acquisition advisory services worldwide with the main base in Japan.

SMBC Aviation Capital

SMBC Aviation Capital, formerly RBS Aviation Capital, is one of the world's largest aircraft leasing companies. Headquartered in the International Financial Services Centre in Dublin and with locations in Amsterdam, Beijing, Hong Kong, Kyiv, Moscow, New York, Seattle, Miami, Shanghai, Singapore, Tokyo and Toulouse, the company employs 160 people.

In 2012, the company was acquired by the Japanese consortium of Sumitomo Mitsui Banking Corporation (SMBC), Sumitomo Mitsui Finance and Leasing Company Limited (SMFL) and Sumitomo Corporation for US$7.3 billion which was the largest ever global sale of an aircraft leasing business. The sale completed on 1 June 2012 and the business was renamed SMBC Aviation Capital.

The company currently has a portfolio of 453 aircraft (273 owned and 180 managed) with a further 203 aircraft on order from Airbus and Boeing, made up of a mix of A320neos, A320-200s, B737-800s and B737 MAXs. It has more than 150 airline customers in over 50 countries worldwide, including a range of traditional carriers alongside start-up airlines.

Its strategy is to own and lease technologically advanced, efficient and frequently-used aircraft types. SMBC Aviation Capital maintains a young fleet with an average weighted age of 4.7 years. The company has a BBB+ rating from Fitch.

The company is now in its 15th year in business. In July 2016, the company completed a debut US$500 million unsecured notes offering, which was eight times over-subscribed.

Bank BTPN

Bank BTPN focuses on serving the mass market segment consisting of pensioners, micro, small and medium enterprises (MSMEs), productive poor communities; consuming class segment; and the corporate segment in Indonesia. By 2019, Sumitomo Mitsui Banking Corporation (SMBC) officially owns 96.9% of PT Bank Tabungan Pensiunan Negara Tbk (BTPN) shares. This is an increase from the previous ownership which was only 39.92%. The gain in the portion of SMBC shares in BTPN is in line with the acquisition of additional shares of 3.33 billion or around 56.98% conducted in January 2019. The shares transaction was carried out at IDR4,282 per share.

Post acquisition, the entity was merged with SMBC's subsidiary in Indonesia. In a summary of the proposed merger of BTPN and Bank Sumitomo Indonesia, the total assets and total equity of the merged bank reached a total IDR 178 trillion and IDR 26.92 trillion respectively, using financial position as of May 31, 2018. Upon the merger, BTPN became the 8th largest bank in Indonesia by total assets.

Bank of East Asia

SMBC has an ownership in Bank of East Asia (BEA). In 2015, the bank increased its investment in BEA by approximately HKD 6.6 billion, bringing SMBC's shareholding in BEA to 17.50% from 9.68% previously.

Digital banking

IC cash card
An IC cash card is a single cash card that can be used with three method of identification: biometric authentication, IC chip or magnetic stripe, by setting the limit and registering biometric information (finger vein pattern). With this cash card, the security of usage improved since transactions relies on IC chip recording data and the pattern of past transactions that combined IC chip recording data and biometric authentication.

As of 2017, SMBC issued IC cash cards at the bank's counters (only applicable to ordinary design deposit cash cards; cards of other designs and non-savings accounts are not eligible for immediate issuance).

Blockchain
Several Blockchain-related initiatives also has been implemented by SMBC. The bank is planning to implement the use of R3's Marco Polo trade finance blockchain, the international blockchain trade finance network, on a commercial basis by the end of 2020.

Artificial Intelligence

SMBC has been an early adopter of AI in its banking operation. It is the first Japanese bank to use IBM Watson since 2014 to support operators at its call center. AmiVoice, a voice recognition solution provided by SMBC, transforms inquiries into text on a real-time basis as a speech recognition system, while IBM Watson gives customers responses taken from service manuals and Q&As, thereby allowing digital operators to provide timely and correct answers to callers.

Environmental policy and record
In 2006 SMBC was among the first Japanese Bank to adopt the Equator Principles, an international set of social and environmental standards for financial institutions launched in 2003. The bank updated its policy to exclude the funding of ultrasupercritical coal power.

SMBC has involved in funding renewable project finance worth three trillion yen globally. As one of the leading players in finance for offshore wind power and solar energy generation, SMBC has been funding renewable power plant projects with a total capacity of more than 10 GW by 2018. Since 2016, the bank has supported 44 project finance deals in renewable energy area. The projects consist of 20 solar energy, 17 wind energy, 3 Geothermal Energy, 2 Hydropower, 1 Biomass 1 Submarine power cable, 1 waste-to-energy in the Americas, Asia, Europe, and Australasia.

However, international environmental groups have criticized SMBC for failing to adhere to its social environmental standards, because SMBC is still involved in the financing of coal projects such as the Vung Ang 2 and Nghi Son 2 coal power station in Vietnam. In December 2019, a research released at United Nations Climate Change conference named SMBC Group among the top three private lender to coal developers between January 2017 and September 2019.

SMBC also involves as one of lead arrangers for a massive oil pipeline under construction in Uganda and Tanzania. The construction of East Africa Crude Oil Pipeline is a part of a push to open oil fields around Uganda’s Lake Albert to international markets, which will be connected to the port of Tanga in Tanzania. The required investment value is estimated at US$3.5 billion. With 1,443 kilometres of length, it will be the longest heated pipeline in the world. International organizations warned the environmental risks to fresh water sources including Lake Victoria, which supports the livelihoods of more than 30 million people in the region.

Having said this, news reported that SMBC is to reconsider its prolific funding of coal-fired plants, the first of the nation's major banks to do so.

Sponsorships

SMBC and Singapore Open have a title sponsorship deal since 2016, making the Singapore top golf tournament commercially known as SMBC Singapore Open. The Singapore Open is a golf tournament in Singapore that is part of the Asian Tour schedule. The event has been held at Sentosa Golf Club since 2005 and since 2017 has been part of the Open Qualifying Series, giving up to four non-exempt players entry into The Open Championship.

In April 2015, Sumitomo Mitsui Banking Corporation became a Gold Partner (banking category) for the Olympic and Paralympic Games Tokyo 2020.

Since 2014, SMBC has owned the naming rights for the Japan Series.

SMBC branch in Tokyo Disneyland

Sumitomo Mitsui Banking Corporation is the only bank that has a branch office in Tokyo Disneyland and Tokyo DisneySea. The branch is the legacy of Mitsui Bank, which was a member of the Mitsui Group when Oriental Land was established. Tokyo Disney Resort project was done by Mitsui Fudosan.

The branch office in Tokyo DisneySea has an unmanned ATM section called "Nihonbashi Branch Tokyo DisneySea Branch", but staff are still assigned to the "Urayasu Branch Tokyo Disneyland Branch" (store number 593) in Tokyo Disneyland. The operating hours follow normal bank operational time. It was possible to open an account and no limitation of total handled customers, but now it is limited only to Urayasu citizens and related parties. The passbook design and the card design are not different from the one issued by ordinary SMBC's branches and cannot be visually differentiated. Previously, the Disneyland branch office also handled foreign currency exchange.

Note, SMBC is not a participating company nor official sponsor of Tokyo Disney Resort. For instance, Disney characters have been used by the Bank of Mitsubishi UFJ as an image character for over half a century since it was adopted by Mitsubishi Bank in 1962.

Related events

Yakuza exclusion ordinances

Since 2011, Japan's law regulators enacted a series of efforts to battle organized crime activities in the country. This includes exclusion ordinances that made it illegal to do business with Yakuza gang members. In 2013, the Financial Services Agency, Japan’s financial watchdog, started an investigation of the three mega banks over possible ties to organised crime after Mizuho banking group was accused of lending more than US$2 million to people affiliated with organized crime groups in Japan. The probe also focused on compliance practices and risk management systems of the banks.

In order to distance themselves from the Yakuza, the Japanese Bankers Association's members, including SMBC Group, started to compile their own lists on Yakuza and other so-called anti-social forces to keep undesirable persons from using their services.

2012 SMBC Nikko Securities insider trading probe

In June 2012, an employee of SMBC Nikko securities was arrested for alleged insider trading due to suspicions of having leaked information on tender offers. The employee allegedly provided leaked information on tender offers for at least more than 10 firms to a company top personnel and other recipients. One such piece of information was regarding a management buyout bid by a wine trading house, Enoteca Co., before the takeover bid was listed on the Tokyo Stock Exchange's Second Section in February.

The said employee worked for SMBC Nikko on secondment from Tokyo-based Sumitomo Mitsui's banking unit since October 2009. He was the deputy head of investment banking at that time and was loaned from SMBC bank. He became the first banker from a major Japanese brokerage to be detained for suspected insider trading since 2008. He was ultimately convicted by Yokohama District Court in 2013 and charged with prison sentence of 2 years and 6 months.

As a consequence of this event, The Tokyo Stock Exchange fined SMBC Nikko Securities 80 million yen (US$1.02 million).

Omori branch employee fraud
A former deputy branch manager of the Omori branch illegally operated the foreign currency deposit transaction system from November 2015 to June 2016. The employee was accused of stealing around ¥190 million (US$1.84 million) by manipulating the bank's foreign exchange trading system.

Hugh Rodley bank raid
A group of criminal hackers including Hugh Rodley, security insider Kevin O'Donoghue, and Soho sex shop owner David Nash were found guilty of an attempted high-tech robbery of £229m from Sumitomo Mitsui Banking Corporation's London branch in September 2004. Henchmen Jan Van Osselaer and Gilles Poelvoorde were also found guilty of conspiracy to steal. The plot was discovered by Sumitomo Mitsui staff, and no money was stolen. Another accused, Bernard Davies, died before trial.

Bank of East Asia dispute with Elliott Management
Hedge fund activist investor Elliott Management filed a lawsuit against BEA in July 2016 in Hong Kong court over a share placement transaction. Elliott Management, which held 7% of listed shares of BEA, had included majority of the bank's directors, its CEO and chairman in the lawsuit. The transaction in question was on BEA's issuance of new shares to Japan's Sumitomo Mitsui Banking Corp (SMBC) in 2015. Elliott cited "allegations of unfairly prejudicial conduct" and "alleged serious corporate governance failings".

In response, BEA applied to have Elliott's petition against them "struck out". This case was heard by Mr. Justice Jonathan Harris from 17 to 19 July 2017.

Notable current and former employees
 Hiroaki Shukuzawa
 Daizo Kusuda, member of the House of Representatives
 Ichiro Miyashita, member of the House of Representatives
 Yoshio Kimura, member of the House of Councillors in the Japan Diet office
 Laurel Powers-Freeling

See also
 Loans in Japan
 List of banks in Japan
 Financial services in Japan
 Japanese financial system

References

External links
 Official website (in Japanese)
 Official website (in English)

Banks of Japan
Mitsui
Banks established in 1996
Banks established in 1876
1876 establishments in Japan
Sumitomo Mitsui Financial Group
Financial services companies based in Tokyo
Japanese companies established in 1996
Sumitomo Group
Systemically important financial institutions